Art metal may refer to:
 Avant-garde metal, heavy metal music that emphasises experimentation and unconventional techniques
 Neoclassical metal, heavy metal strongly influenced by classical music
 Post-metal, music that is rooted in heavy metal but discards many of its conventions
 Progressive metal, a fusion of heavy metal with progressive rock
 Art Metal (band), a Swedish band led by Jonas Hellborg
 Art Metal (album), the band's debut album
 Art rock, a subgenre of rock music
 Art metal, a fusion genre of heavy metal and art rock. Closely related to post metal and progressive metal.